BBC Weekend News is the BBC's national news programme on BBC One at the weekend and bank holidays, although it is often referred to on guides simply as BBC News. It is called BBC Weekend News on all bulletins, apart from the late bulletin on Sunday where it is named BBC News at Ten. The programmes are simulcast on the BBC News Channel, unless it clashes with the edition of World News Today at 9:00pm or a major news story is being covered on the News Channel.

Format
BBC Weekend News airs three times on both Saturday and Sunday. The main three bulletins are presented in the studio in a similar format to other national news bulletins on BBC One but are shorter in length.

The lunchtime bulletin is normally at 1:00pm although these times often vary. The programme lasts approximately 15 minutes including the sport and is immediately followed on BBC One by a weather forecast on Saturday and Sunday.

The evening bulletin contains a sports update from the BBC sports centre in Salford, and is at 6:00pm on Saturday and Sunday depending on scheduling. It is followed by regional news.

The late bulletin contains a sports update from the BBC sports centre in Salford, and is at 10:00pm on Saturday and Sunday depending on scheduling. There is a BBC One regional news after the Sunday late news on BBC One.

Presenters

Lunchtime
For a long time the lunchtime bulletin was presented by the on-duty BBC News Channel presenter during the scheduled bulletin. Maxine Mawhinney was the long term presenter from 2006 until 2015. Following a reshuffle, BBC News 24 launch presenter Gavin Esler became the main presenter until his departure from the channel in early 2017. Mawhinney briefly returned to the role until her departure in April 2017 and Shaun Ley took over afterwards. Following the COVID-19 pandemic in spring and summer 2020, the main presenter of the Saturday bulletin was Carrie Gracie and the Sunday presenter normally continued to be Ben Brown. On 25 August 2020, Carrie Gracie announced that she had left the BBC.  From then, Shaun Ley returned as the main host on Saturdays (alternating with Geeta Guru-Murthy once every 4 weeks). However, Ben Brown continued to present the programme every Sunday. On Saturday 24th April 2021, the BBC rolled out a new repetitive presenting rota for the newsreaders - lasting for 4 weeks before it started again. From late December 2022, the lunchtime bulletin is normally presented by the presenter that covers the mid-afternoon shift on the BBC News Channel. 

The weekend bulletins are no longer simulcast on the BBC News Channel. This is in advance of changes due to take place in Spring 2023 that will see the BBC News Channel merge with BBC World.

Current presenters

Relief presenters include; Luxmy Gopal and Geeta Guru-Murthy.

Evening
Unlike the lunchtime bulletin, the presenter of the two evening bulletins has usually been a dedicated presenter for that evening on BBC One, with the surrounding news presentation on the BBC News Channel being presented by another presenter. The programmes are presented by Clive Myrie, Reeta Chakrabarti, Martine Croxall and Mishal Husain.

Senior presenters, such as Huw Edwards and Sophie Raworth, can appear in the event of a major news story or as relief.

The Bank Holiday news bulletins can be presented by either a member of the BBC Weekend News team or a presenter from the BBC News at One, BBC News at Six or BBC News at Ten.

Current presenters

Former presenters
If there is no position before the years of being a presenter, then this newsreader was either a relief presenter or occasional guest stand-in presenter.

George Alagiah (1999–2002)
Matthew Amroliwala (2001–2014 and 2022)
Michael Aspel (Main presenter, 1964–1972)
Richard Baker (1954–1982)
Jennie Bond (Main presenter, 1988–1999)
Fiona Bruce (Main presenter, 1999–2005)
Michael Buerk (Main presenter, 1988–2003)
Jill Dando (Main presenter, 1988–1999)
Robert Dougall (Main presenter, 1964–1973)
Chris Eakin (2013–2015)
Gavin Esler (2002, Main presenter, 2015–2017)
Joanna Gosling (2008–2011)
Andrew Harvey (Main presenter, 1984–1999)
Philip Hayton (Main presenter, 1984–1993, 2005)
John Humphrys (Main presenter, 1981–1993)
Darren Jordon (2001–2006)
Kenneth Kendall (1954–1981)
Sue Lawley (Main presenter, 1983–1988)
Jan Leeming (Main presenter, 1980–1987)
Chris Lowe (Main presenter, 1988–1999, 2006-2007)
Jon Sopel (2003)
Martyn Lewis (1988–1999)
Emily Maitlis (2006–2013)
Maxine Mawhinney (Main presenter, 1999–2017)
Laurie Mayer (1985–1993)
Louise Minchin (2006–2012)
Clarence Mitchell (1999–2005)
Christopher Morris (1984–1993)
Riz Lateef (2008-2013)
Sophie Raworth (2002–2006)
Angela Rippon (1975–1983)
John Simpson (1981–1988)
Peter Sissons (Main presenter, 1993–2009)
Julia Somerville (2011–2012)
Edward Stourton (1993–1999)
Moira Stuart (Main presenter, 1981–1998, 2006)
Carole Walker (2012–2017)
Richard Whitmore (Main presenter, 1972–1988)
Sian Williams (1999–2013)
Nicholas Witchell (Main presenter, 1981–1999)
Peter Woods (Main presenter, 1964–1981)
Nicholas Owen (2007-2018)
Sophie Long (2010-2013, 2017)
Rebecca Jones (2015-2017)
Karin Giannone (2017)
Simon McCoy (2008-2021)
Tina Daheley (2018-2020)
Kate Silverton (Main presenter, 2008-2021)
Joanna Gosling (Main presenter, 1999-2023)

Sports News
During the late programme on each day a round up of the days sports news is presented from the BBC Sport Centre at MediaCityUK, Salford. This is usually presented by one of the BBC News channel sports presenters: Olly Foster, Karthi Gnanasegaram, Lizzie Greenwood-Hughes and Katherine Downes.

References

1954 British television series debuts
1950s British television series
1960s British television series
1970s British television series
1980s British television series
1990s British television series
2000s British television series
2010s British television series
2020s British television series
BBC television news shows